Footprints: The Best of Powderfinger, 2001–2011 is the second greatest hits album by Australian alternative rock band Powderfinger, released on 5 November 2011 in Australia.

The album contained tracks from Powderfinger's last three albums, as well as the single "I'm On Your Side", which was released in 2010 for the Flood Relief, and two previously unreleased songs, "Empty Space" and "Silver Bullet".

"Empty Space" was released to radio on 10 October and a music video released later on 18 October.

Background
The compilation was first announced on 22 June 2011 in an article announcing the release of the band's first authorised biography. It was revisited in greater detail on 7 October, when the band released a trailer of the biography on their website.

Track listing

Charts

Year-end charts

Certifications

References

Powderfinger albums
2011 greatest hits albums
Compilation albums by Australian artists